The  was an army of the Imperial Japanese Army during the Second Sino-Japanese War.

History
The Japanese 12th Army was formed on November 7, 1938 under the North China Area Army as a garrison force for the occupation the provinces North China. It served primary as a training and reserve unit, and participated in counter-insurgency operations.

The 59th division famous for its wartime atrocities was attached to the Twelfth Army from February 1942 till May 1945.

The 12th Army was demobilized at Zhengzhou, Henan Province on the surrender of Japan.

List of Commanders

Commanding officers

Chief of Staff

References

External links

12
Military units and formations established in 1938
Military units and formations disestablished in 1945